Sinan Joo clan is one of the Korean clans. Their Bon-gwan is in Anhui, China. According to the research held in 2000, the number of Sinan Joo clan’s member was 151,227. He worked at the Hanlin Academy as a Taixue Boshi or Erudite of the National University during the Song dynasty, but exiled himself to Goryeo with his family and colleague in 1212 because he feared for his physical safety before the Song dynasty’s collapse to the Mongols. He became the founder of the Sinan Joo clan.

See also 
 Korean clan names of foreign origin

References

External links 
 

 
Korean clan names of Chinese origin
Ju clans